Hidden Bay Airport  is an abandoned aerodrome that was located near Hidden Bay, on Wollaston Lake, in north-eastern Saskatchewan, Canada. It was located off Highway 905, about 264 kilometres north of Southend and about 220 kilometres south of Black Lake.

See also 
 List of airports in Saskatchewan
 List of defunct airports in Canada

References 

Defunct airports in Saskatchewan
Division No. 18, Unorganized, Saskatchewan